"Shattered Dreams" is a 1987 song by Johnny Hates Jazz. It may also refer to:

Literature
 Shattered Dreams, a 1979 novel by Sally Wentworth
 Shattered Dreams: My Life as a Polygamist's Wife, a book by Irene Spencer
 Shattered Dreams: The Story of Charlotte Fedders, a 1987 book by Charlotte Fedders
 Shattered Dreams: God`s Unexpected Pathway to Joy, a 2001 book by Larry Crabb

Film and television
 Shattered Dreams (1922 film), American silent drama film directed by Paul Scardon
 Shattered Dreams (1990 film), TV film starring Lindsay Wagner and Michael Nouri based on the Charlotte Fedders novel
 "Shattered Dreams", 1985 episode of Dallas
 "Shattered Dreams", 2007 episode of Global Currents
 "Shattered Dreams", 2012 episode of After the First 48

Music
 The Shattered Dream, a 1986 album by Hungry for What, in association with BYO Records
 "Shattered Dreams", a song from the 2010 album Memphis Blues by Cyndi Lauper
"Shattered Dreams", a song from the 2018 album Some Rap Songs by Earl Sweatshirt